Don Valley Academy member of Delta Academies Trust (formerly Don Valley School and Performing Arts College) is a mixed 11–18 Academy located in Scawthorpe, Doncaster, South Yorkshire, England. The school also has a Sixth Form centre.

History
The original school was built in the mid-1950s, with the first intake of pupils in September 1957. What was effectively another school was built in the mid-1960s as part of the move by the West Riding County Council to comprehensive education. It had more facilities than the existing one, including a swimming pool and much enhanced stage facilities in the main hall. The new school took up approximately half of the former playing fields . The second school ran for a year or so as a separate entity before the two merged to become Don Valley Comprehensive School. This naming was only brief and the school was soon renamed back to Don Valley High School, reportedly at the insistence of the then headmaster, Mr Horncastle. The newer school served students in their first three years of senior school, aged 11 to 14; the older school served them in the remainder of their time, aged 14 to 18, and included the lower and upper sixth forms.

In 2006, Don Valley became a Performing Arts College. Every student has a choice of dramatic arts or media to study. In 2011, Don Valley became an academy progressing from a performing arts school.

Doncaster Collegiate Sixth Form 
The school is part of the Doncaster Collegiate Sixth Form which combines the sixth form offering from Ash Hill Academy, De Warenne Academy, Don Valley Academy, Rossington All Saints Academy and Serlby Park Academy.

Notable alumni
 Sarah Stevenson, British Taekwondo Olympic bronze medallist

References

External links
 https://www.donvalleyacademy.org.uk/

Academies in Doncaster
Secondary schools in Doncaster
Delta schools